Erovnuli Liga playoffs is the annual knockout stage to determine the seat of Erovnuli Liga between the football team from Umaglesi Liga and Erovnuli Liga 2. Since 2001, the team were from Erovnuli Liga which finished right above relegated team, and from Erovnuli Liga 2 which finished right below promoted team.

Results

1991

1999
First Round

Sioni Bolnisi remain at Umaglesi Liga. TSU Tbilisi entered losing side playoffs

Dinamo-2 Tbilisi promoted and renamed as Tbilisi. Kolkheti Khobi promoted.

Second Round

TSU Tbilisi remain at Umaglesi Liga.

2000
Not held

2001

2002

2003

2004

2005
Not held

2006

2007

2008

2011

2012
Not held

2013
Not held

2014
Not held

2015

2016 (spring)

2016 (autumn)

Dila Gori were retained their place for 2017 Erovnuli Liga; Guria Lanchkhuti were relegated to 2017 Erovnuli Liga 2.

Shukura Kobuleti were retained their place for 2017 Erovnuli Liga; Sioni Bolnisi were relegated to 2017 Erovnuli Liga 2

2017

Sioni Bolnisi are promoted to 2018 Erovnuli Liga.

Both teams remained in their leagues respectively.

2018

Both teams remained in their leagues respectively.

WIT Georgia are promoted to 2019 Erovnuli Liga.

2019

Telavi are promoted to 2020 Erovnuli Liga.

Samtredia are promoted to 2020 Erovnuli Liga.

2020

Both teams remained in their leagues respectively.

Samgurali are promoted to 2021 Erovnuli Liga.

2021

Gagra were promoted to 2022 Erovnuli Liga.

Torpedo retained a place in 2022 Erovnuli Liga.

2022

FC Samtredia were promoted to 2023 Erovnuli Liga.

Gagra retained a place in 2023 Erovnuli Liga.

External links
 

playoffs
Erovnuli Liga 2